Brian W. Murray is an American state legislator serving in the Massachusetts House of Representatives. He is a Milford resident and a member of the Democratic Party.

See also
 2019–2020 Massachusetts legislature
 2021–2022 Massachusetts legislature

References

Living people
Democratic Party members of the Massachusetts House of Representatives
People from Milford, Massachusetts
21st-century American politicians
Year of birth missing (living people)